Agriphila tolli is a species of moth in the family Crambidae. It is found in Ukraine, Romania, Bulgaria, Turkey, Greece, the Republic of North Macedonia, Albania, Montenegro, Hungary, Slovakia, the Czech Republic, Austria, Italy and on Corsica, Sicily and Crete.

Subspecies
Agriphila poliellus poliellus
Agriphila poliellus pelsonius Fazekas, 1985 (Carpathian basin)

References

Moths described in 1952
Crambini
Moths of Europe
Moths of Asia